Rudolf Noelte (21 March 1921 – 8 November 2002) was a German film director, theater director and opera director.

Filmography

Film
 The Castle (1968, based on The Castle)

Television
 Pygmalion (1957, based on Pygmalion)
 Draußen vor der Tür (1957, based on The Man Outside)
 Die Kassette (1961, based on a play by Carl Sternheim)
 Die Wildente (1961, based on The Wild Duck)
 König Ödipus (1963, based on Oedipus Rex)
 Der Kammersänger (1964, based on a play by Frank Wedekind)
 Drei Schwestern (1966, based on Three Sisters)
 Die Fliegen (1966, based on The Flies)
 Woyzeck (1966, based on Woyzeck)
 Der zerbrochene Krug (1967, based on The Broken Jug)
 Der Kirschgarten (1970, based on The Cherry Orchard)
 Der Menschenfeind (1976, based on The Misanthrope)
 Der Todestanz (1977, based on The Dance of Death)
 Die Ratten (1977, based on The Rats)
 Die Wildente (1981, based on The Wild Duck)
 Dantons Tod (1981, based on Danton's Death)
 Elisabeth von England (1983, based on a play by Ferdinand Bruckner)

External links

1921 births
2002 deaths
Mass media people from Berlin
German opera directors
German theatre directors
Officers Crosses of the Order of Merit of the Federal Republic of Germany